Xiahou He (220 - 266), courtesy name Yiquan, was an official of the state of Cao Wei during the Three Kingdoms period of China.

Life
Xiahou He was the seventh son of Xiahou Yuan, a general who served under Cao Cao, the warlord who laid the foundation for the Cao Wei state in the late Eastern Han dynasty before the Three Kingdoms period. He served in various positions in the Cao Wei government, including Intendant of Henan and Minister of Ceremonies. He also served as a Left Major and an Attendant under Sima Zhao, the Wei regent.

In March 264, the Wei general Zhong Hui started a rebellion in the former territories of Wei's rival state Shu Han after helping Wei conquer them in the previous year. At the time, Xiahou He had been appointed by the Wei government as an emissary to visit Zhong Hui in Chengdu, the former capital of Shu, so he used his imperial authority to command the Wei military forces to aid in the suppression of Zhong Hui's rebellion. He was later enfeoffed as a district marquis for his contributions.

Xiahou continued serving under the Jin dynasty (266–420), which replaced the Cao Wei state, and held the position of Minister of the Household in the Jin government.

See also
 Lists of people of the Three Kingdoms

References

 Chen, Shou (3rd century). Records of the Three Kingdoms (Sanguozhi).
 Pei, Songzhi (5th century). Annotations to Records of the Three Kingdoms (Sanguozhi zhu).

Year of birth unknown
Year of death unknown
Cao Wei politicians
Cao Wei generals
Mayors of Luoyang